True Detective is an American anthology crime drama television series created and written by Nic Pizzolatto, that premiered on January 12, 2014, on HBO. The series focuses on police investigations and on the effect they have on troubled detectives that carry them out. Each season is structured as a self-contained narrative with different sets of characters and settings, and consists of eight episodes that have been between 54 and 87 minutes in length.

Series overview

Episodes

Season 1 (2014) 

In 2012, two former homicide investigators with the Louisiana State Police's Criminal Investigations Division, Rustin "Rust" Cohle (Matthew McConaughey) and Martin "Marty" Hart (Woody Harrelson), are summoned for questioning by detectives Maynard Gilbough (Michael Potts) and Thomas Papania (Tory Kittles), about the Dora Lange murder investigation of 1995; they have not seen nor spoken to each other since an altercation concerning Martin's wife Maggie Hart (Michelle Monaghan) over a decade prior. With many of the old files destroyed in Hurricane Rita, the two men are asked to recount the history of their working relationship, personal lives, and the Dora Lange murder investigation, as well as a series of other related individual cases as new evidence suggests that the perpetrator remains at large.

Season 2 (2015) 

California Highway Patrol officer Paul Woodrugh (Taylor Kitsch) discovers the dead body of a city manager who was involved in a major land deal. Given the ambiguous jurisdictional nature of the crime scene, two other officers, Vinci Police Department Detective Raymond Velcoro (Colin Farrell) and Ventura County Sheriff's Office CID Antigone "Ani" Bezzerides (Rachel McAdams), along with Woodrugh are assigned to investigate the murder. The crime soon involves Frank Semyon (Vince Vaughn), a career criminal who was involved in the land deal and whose life savings were stolen when the murder took place. The three detectives, plus Semyon, quickly realize a larger conspiracy at play involving the victim's ties to the city of Vinci's deepening corrupt proliferations.

Season 3 (2019)

The story takes place in the Ozarks over three separate time periods. In 1980, partner detectives Wayne Hays (Mahershala Ali) and Roland West (Stephen Dorff) investigate a macabre crime involving two missing children. In 1990, Hays and West are subpoenaed after a major break in the case. In 2015, a retired Hays is asked by a true crime documentary producer to look back at the unsolved case.

Ratings

References

External links 
 
 

Episodes
Lists of American crime drama television series episodes